The Parliamentary Budget Office (PBO) is an agency of the Australian Parliament whose purpose is to "inform the parliament by providing independent and non-partisan analysis of the budget cycle, fiscal policy and the financial implications of proposals". It was established by the Gillard Government following minority government formation negotiations. Following that commitment, a Joint Parliamentary Committee on the Parliamentary Budget Office was convened, chaired by John Faulkner. The PBO's independence is enshrined in legislation.

In 2013, then-Treasurer Wayne Swan introduced legislation requiring the PBO to conduct a post-election audit to cost political parties' electoral commitments.

In its first independent report, the PBO noted that the Australian federal budget had an underlying structural deficit, caused in part by Howard Government personal income tax cuts.

See also 
 Parliament of Australia
 Australian federal budget
 Compare:
Parliamentary Budget Advisory Service (South Australia)
Legislative Analyst's Office (California)
Congressional Budget Office (United States)
Bureau for Economic Policy Analysis (Netherlands) 
Parliamentary Budget Officer (Canada)
National Assembly Budget Office (The Republic of Korea)
Office for Budget Responsibility (United Kingdom)

References 

Economic research institutes
2012 establishments in Australia
Government agencies established in 2012
Independent government agencies of Australia
Government finances in Australia
Parliament of Australia